Frank Aloysius Mullen (August 9, 1887 – September 27, 1945) was a diver at the 1920 Summer Olympics in Antwerp.

Personal life
Mullen served in the United States Marine Corps during World War I.

References

1887 births
1945 deaths
American male divers
Olympic divers of the United States
Divers at the 1920 Summer Olympics
Sportspeople from New York City
United States Marine Corps personnel of World War I